Southern Ukraine or south Ukraine refers, generally, to the oblasts in the south of Ukraine.

The territory usually corresponds with the Soviet economical district, the Southern Economical District of the Ukrainian Soviet Socialist Republic. The region is completely integrated with a marine and shipbuilding industry.

During the 2022 Russian invasion of Ukraine, the region became the scene of the Southern Ukraine campaign.

Historical background
The region primarily corresponds to the former Kherson, Taurida, and most of the Yekaterinoslav Governorates which spanned across the northern coast of Black Sea after the Russian-Ottoman Wars of 1768–74 and 1787–92.

The Kurgan hypothesis places the Pontic steppes of Ukraine and southern Russia as the linguistic homeland of the Proto-Indo-Europeans. The Yamnaya culture is identified with the late Proto-Indo-Europeans. The region has been inhabited for centuries by various nomadic tribes, such as Scythians, Sarmatians, Alans, Huns, Bulgars, Pechenegs, Kipchaks, Turco-Mongols and Tatars.

Before the 18th century, the territory known as the Wild Fields (as translated from Polish or Ukrainian) was dominated by Ukrainian Cossack community better known as Zaporozhian Sich and the realm of Crimean Khanate with its Nogai minions that was a union state of the bigger Ottoman Empire. The Crimean–Nogai slave raids caused considerable devastation and depopulation in the area before the rise of the Zaporozhian Cossacks.

Encroachment of Muscovy (today Russia) in the region started after the 16th century after its expansion along Volga river after the Moscow-Kazan wars and conquest of Astrakhan. Further expansion continued also with Moscow-Lithuania armed clashes.

With start of the Khmelnytsky Uprising within Polish–Lithuanian Commonwealth in middle of 17th century, Muscovy on pretence of the eastern Orthodoxy protection further expanded its influence down south over Cossack communities of Pontic steppes (lower Don and lower Dnieper) and the Crimean Khan domains.

At the end of 17th century a native Kyivan, bishop Theophan Prokopovych came up with the idea of all-Russian nation referring to the old Rus state founder of which Volodymyr the Great was baptized and accepted Byzantine-rite Christianity (today known as Eastern Orthodoxy) in Chersoneses of Taurida (today in Sevastopol).

In 1686 there was signed the Treaty of Perpetual Peace between Muscovy and Polish–Lithuanian Commonwealth, after which Muscovy took control over the Left-bank Ukraine, Zaporozhian Sich, and Kyiv with outskirts.

In 18th century there was built Ukrainian line and lands of earlier destroyed Zaporozhian Sich were resettled by Serbs creating territories of New Serbia and Slovianoserbia.

At the end of 18th century following the annexation of Crimea by the Russian Empire and the treaty of Jassy (the Ochakiv Region, area of today's Odesa and Mykolaiv oblasts), the Russian Empire assumed full control of the northern Black Sea coast.

Russian Hellenization of Pontic littoral
After the Russian-Ottoman Wars of the second half of 18th century (1768–74 and 1787–92) and acquisition of all territory of modern southern Ukraine, number of settlements and cities with Turkic or other names in region were renamed in Greek or Russian manner.
 Acidere → Ovidiopol
 Hacıbey → Odesa
 Orel Sloboda (Catherinine sconce) → Olviopol (today Pervomaisk, Mykolaiv Oblast)
 Domakha → Mariupol (by Balaklava Greeks from outskirts of Bakhchysarai)
 Bilehowisce (Alexander sconce) → Kherson
 Aqyar → Sebastopol (today Sevastopol)
 Kezlev → Yevpatoria
 Kiz-yar → Novo-alexandrovka (Novo-olexandrivka) Sloboda → Melitopol
 Caffa (Kefe) → Theodosia (today Feodosia)
 Aqmescit → Simferopol
 Mykytyn Rih → Slaviansk → Nikopol
 Usivka (Bečej sconce) → Alexandria (today Oleksandriia)
 Sucleia (Sredinnaya fortress) → Tiraspol (in Moldova)
 Czorna → Grigoriopol (in Moldova)

Following the World War II any trace of Crimean Tatar toponymy was predominantly removed in Crimea and Kherson Oblast.

Situation in 2014
Russian is the dominant language in the region (in the schools of the Ukrainian SSR learning Ukrainian was mandatory), although not to the extent that it is in the three oblasts that comprise eastern Ukraine. Effective in August 2012, a new law on regional languages entitles any local language spoken by at least a 10% minority be declared official within that area. Within weeks Russian was declared as a regional language in several southern and eastern oblasts and cities. Russian could then be used in these cities/oblasts' administrative office work and documents. On 23 February 2014, the Ukrainian parliament voted to repeal the law on regional languages, which would have made Ukrainian the sole state language at all levels even in southern and eastern Ukraine. This vote was vetoed by acting President Turchynov on March 2. Nevertheless the law was repealed by the Constitutional Court of Ukraine on 28 February 2018 when it ruled the law unconstitutional.

Noticeable cultural differences in the region (compared with the rest of Ukraine, except eastern Ukraine) are more "positive views" of the Russian language and of Joseph Stalin and more "negative views" of Ukrainian nationalism. In the 1991 Ukrainian independence referendum, a lower percentage of the total electorate voted for independence in eastern and southern Ukraine than in the rest of the country.

In a poll conducted by Kyiv International Institute of Sociology in the first half of February 2014, 19.4% of those polled in southern Ukraine believed "Ukraine and Russia must unite into a single state"; nationwide this percentage was 12.5.

During elections voters of the southern (and eastern) oblasts (provinces) of Ukraine vote for the parties (Communist Party of Ukraine, Party of Regions) and the presidential candidates (Viktor Yanukovych) with a pro-Russian and status quo platform. The electorate of the CPU and the Party of Regions was very loyal to them. But following the Revolution of Dignity the Party of Regions collapsed and the Communist Party was banned and declared illegal.

Religion

According to a 2016 survey of religion in Ukraine conducted by the Razumkov Center, around 65.7% of the population of southern Ukraine declared to be believers in any religion, while 7.4% declared to be non-believers, and 3.2% declared to be atheists and agnostics. the study also found that 77.6% of the total southern Ukraine population declared to be Christians (71.0% Eastern Orthodox, 5.1% simply Christians, 0.5% Latin Rite Catholics, 0.53% members of various Protestant churches, 0.5% members of the Ukrainian Greek Catholic Church), and 0.5% were Jewish. Not religious and other believers not identifying with any of the listed major religious institutions constituted about 24.7% of the population.

Oblasts

The neighbouring Kirovohrad Oblast is more often associated with the Central Ukraine. Also Crimea (with Sevastopol City) is reviewed sometimes as a unique region. According to the Encyclopedia of Ukraine, south Ukraine was considered to consist of the territory of the former Kherson, Taurida and Yekaterinoslav Governorates.

See also
Central Ukraine
Dnieper Ukraine
Eastern Ukraine
Western Ukraine
Wild Fields

References

External links
 South Ukraine at Encyclopedia of Ukraine

Geographic regions of Ukraine